Trost i taklampa (Blackbird in the Chandelier) is a Norwegian comedy film from 1955 directed by Erik Borge. It is based on Alf Prøysen's 1950 novel Trost i taklampa.

The film stars Grete Nordrå as Gunvor Smikkstugun, along with Jack Fjeldstad and Martin Gisti.

Cast

 Grete Nordrå as Gunvor Smikkstugun
 Martin Gisti as Lundjordet
 William Nyrén as Hjalmar
 Jack Fjeldstad as Brekkestøl
 Roy Bjørnstad as Roy
 Siri Rom as Elise
 Astrid Sommer as Gunvor's mother
 Lillemor Hoel as Eva Snekkersveen
 Pål Bang-Hansen as Arne Barnhemmet
 Randi Nordby as Ingebjørg
 Ragnar Olason as Gunvor's father
 Kristian Løvlie as Oskar
 Ottar Wicklund as Aksel Snekkersveen
 Ada Ørvik as Emma
 Harald Aimarsen as Smikkstad
 Gunda Ullsaker as Mrs. Smikkstad
 Agnes Bjerke as Krestine
 Alf Prøysen as himself
 Anker Wahlstrøm 		
 Gudmund Blaalid 		
 Joachim Calmeyer 		
 Willie Hoel as Teodor Snekkersveen

Songs
 "Trippe-Tripp" (foxtrot) (melody: Maj Sønstevold, lyrics: Alf Prøysen). Issued on 78 rpm (Philips AA 53018-1-H)
 "Blåklokkeleiken" (waltz) (melody: Maj Sønstevold, lyrics: Alf Prøysen). Issued on 78 rpm (Philips AA 53018-2-H)

References

External links 
 
 Trost i taklampa at the National Library of Norway

1955 films
Norwegian comedy films
1950s Norwegian-language films
1955 comedy films
Norwegian black-and-white films